The Wilisch is a river of Saxony, Germany. It is a left tributary of the Zschopau, which it joins near the town Zschopau.

See also
List of rivers of Saxony

Rivers of Saxony
Rivers of Germany